Telenuovo is an Italian regional television channel of Veneto owned by Luigi Vinco. It transmits a light entertainment program: movies, news and weather bulletins, documentary film and sports on LCN 11 in Veneto and 14 in Trentino-Alto Adige.

History 
Telenuovo commenced operations on November 12, 1979 at 17:30. The first show seen on the station was anime series Lupin III. For a few years, the station was a part of the Rete Italia syndication network led by Silvio Berlusconi's Tele Milano with a schedule consisting of movies, TV shows, cartoons and many self-produced sports shows. In 1981, the channel expands their coverage to the whole of Veneto and Trentino Alto-Adige and opened their news department in 1984. At this point, their news department had become a basic element of the station, featuring debates on the various aspects of local society and news bulletins. The first news bulletin from their Padova headquarters debuted in 1994. In 2007, the channel's web portal launched.

Programming 
Rosso & Nero - a daily talk show, airing at 12:50, hosted by Mario Zwirner and focusing on the various aspects of politics, economy and associations in themes of large information
L'Opinione - Mario Zwirner expresses his own personal opinion on political and social facts
Studionews - current affairs program which looks at current issues in full detail
Alé Verona - weekly program that follows the matches of Hellas Verona
Alé Padova - weekly program that follows the matches of Calcio Padova
Supermercato - comments and interviews show focusing on local football
TgVerona - news bulletin for Verona, airing at 18:45, 20:30 and 01:00
TgPadova - news bulletin for Padova, airing at 19:30, 20:30 and 23:30
TgVeneto - a look at the regional events from both studios, airing at 14:20
TgGialloblu - sports section of TgVerona
TgBiancoscudato - sports section of TgPadova

Staff
Mario Zwirner
Gianluca Vighini
Luca Fioravanti
Alessandro Betteghella
Martina Moscato
Marco Campanale

Former Journalists
Germano Mosconi
Gianluca di Marzio

References

External links 
Official Site 

Television channels in Italy
Television channels and stations established in 1979
Free-to-air
Italian-language television networks